C1orf159 is a protein that in human is encoded by the C1orf159 gene located on chromosome 1. This gene is also found to be an unfavorable prognosis marker for renal and liver cancer, and a favorable prognosis marker for urothelial cancer.

Gene 
The Homo sapiens C1orf159 gene (UniProt ID: Q96HA4) is a gene located on the short arm of chromosome 1 at locus 1p36.33. The gene is 34,247 base pairs in length, located at Chromosome 1 position 1,081,818 to 1,116,089 on the reverse strand.

Transcript 
The longest variant of human C1orf159 gene encodes an mRNA that is 2,432 nucleotides in length with 12 exons. A promoter region was predicted using UCSC Genome Browser, which is 762 nucleotides long, including a 434 nucleotide upstream of the transcriptional start site, exon 1, and a 298 nucleotide region of intron 1.

Protein

Isoforms 
Alternative splicing of the gene creates 5 protein isoforms. The longest isoform is 380 amino acids in length with a molecular mass of 40.382 kDa.

Composition 
C1orf159 protein is a proline- and arginine-rich, and a lysine- and glutamic acid- poor protein. The isoelectric point of the human C1orf159 protein is 10.07, which is more basic than the average human proteomic protein pI of 7.36.

Domain 
The human C1orf159 protein contains a domain of unknown function DUF4501. Although the exact function of the domain is not clear, it is thought to be a single pass-membrane protein with highly conserved cysteine residues.

The protein also contains a transmembrane domain at positions 144-169 and a signal peptide at positions 1-18.

Structure 
Alphafold predicts the structure of human C1orf159 protein to be mainly composed of alpha-helices.

Post-translational modification 
The predicted post-translational modifications of the C1orf159 protein includes N-linked glycosylation on asparagine at positions 104, 111, and 128.

Homology/evolution

Orthologs 
Orthologs of human C1orf159 are found in vertebrates including mammals, birds, reptiles, amphibians, and fish with the most distantly related group of organisms being cartilaginous fish, with a date of divergence of approximately 450 million years ago. Orthologs are not found in jawless fish or invertebrates.

Evolutionary History 
When compared with the evolution rate with cytochrome c and fibrinogen alpha, the C1orf159 protein has a similar evolutionary rate of change to the fast-evolving fibrinogen alpha protein, C1orf159 protein has a relatively fast evolution rate.

Clinical Significance 
The Human Protein Atlas shows that C1orf159 is an unfavorable prognosis marker for renal and liver cancer, and a favorable prognosis marker for urothelial cancer, indicating that a high expression of C1orf159 is associated with a lower survival probability for patients with renal and liver cancer, and is associated with a higher survival probability for patients with urothelial cancer.

References